The 1807 Connecticut gubernatorial election took place on April 9, 1807. Incumbent Federalist Governor Jonathan Trumbull Jr. won re-election to a tenth full term, defeating Democratic-Republican candidate William Hart in a re-match of the previous year's election.

Results

References 

Gubernatorial
Connecticut
1807